Museum Koenig is a station on the Bonn Stadtbahn located in Bonn Südstadt, Germany. This station is served by all lines (except line 18 and the tramway system).

References

External links

Buildings and structures in Bonn
Railway stations in North Rhine-Westphalia
Tram transport in Germany
Underground rapid transit in Germany
Cologne-Bonn Stadtbahn stations